William Dietz (June 28, 1778 – August 24, 1848) was an American farmer and politician from New York. From 1825 to 1827, he served one term in the  U.S. House of Representatives.

Life
He attended the district schools and engaged in agricultural pursuits. He was Town Clerk of Schoharie and Supervisor of Schoharie County.

Militia
He was a colonel of the State Militia.

State legislature 
He was a member of the New York State Assembly (Schoharie Co.) in 1814, 1814–15 and 1823.

Congress 
Dietz was elected as a Jacksonian to the 19th United States Congress, holding office from March 4, 1825, to March 3, 1827.

Return to legislature 
He was a member of the New York State Senate (3rd D.) from 1830 to 1833, sitting in the 53rd, 54th, 55th and 56th New York State Legislatures.

Later career 
He was a presidential elector in 1832, voting for Andrew Jackson and Martin Van Buren.

He was County Superintendent of the Poor from 1834 to 1835.

Death 
He died on August 24, 1828 and was buried at the St. Paul’s Lutheran Cemetery in Schoharie.

References

History of Schoharie County New York, 1713-1882 by William E. Roscoe (page 105)
The New York Civil List compiled by Franklin Benjamin Hough (pages 71, 128f, 140, 188, 190, 200, 269f, 322 and 327; Weed, Parsons and Co., 1858) [mostly misspelling "Deitz"]

1778 births
1848 deaths
People from Schoharie, New York
1832 United States presidential electors
Members of the New York State Assembly
New York (state) state senators
Jacksonian members of the United States House of Representatives from New York (state)
19th-century American politicians
Members of the United States House of Representatives from New York (state)